Mesoraca is a comune and town  in the province of Crotone, in Calabria, southern Italy.

Economy

Mesoraca relies on the production of oil, wine, cereals, citruses, and intensive cattle rearing.

Twin towns — sister cities
Mesoraca is twinned with:

  Lavena Ponte Tresa, Italy

References

Cities and towns in Calabria